United Arab Emirates National Olympic Committee (IOC code: UAE) is a National Olympic Committee which represents United Arab Emirates.

The National Olympic Committee of United Arab Emirates (NOC) was named 1979 under the Ministerial Decision No. 200 of 19. and joined the International Olympic Committee in 1980, the Arab Federation of Sports Games in 1980, the National Olympic Committees Association in 1981, the Olympic Council of Asia in 1982 and the Islamic Sports Solidarity Federation in 1985.

External link 
United Arab Emirates Olympic Committee

United Arab Emirates
Oly
Sports organizations established in 1979
 
1979 establishments in the United Arab Emirates